Theodore Roosevelt Antrum (1903–10 – May 21, 1948) was an American blues musician from South Carolina, United States. Little is known of his life.

Biography
Antrim was possibly born in Hodges, South Carolina, United States. His exact birth date is unknown, and was speculated by census records to be as early as 1903 and as late as 1910. Antrim recorded four songs for Bluebird Records in Charlotte, North Carolina, in 1937. Three of the records are Twelve-bar blues songs, and one is a Piedmont blues song, possibly influenced by contemporary North Carolina musician Blind Boy Fuller. It is unknown whether Antrim played the guitar on any of the records.

Antrim died on May 21, 1948. He is buried in York Memorial Cemetery, in Charlotte, North Carolina.

Recordings 
All recordings were made on August 7, 1937 in Charlotte, North Carolina
 "No Use of Worryin'"
 "Complaint To Make"
 "I Guess You're Satisfied"
 "Station Boy Blues"

References

1948 deaths
20th-century African-American male singers
Singers from South Carolina
American blues singers
Piedmont blues musicians
20th-century American guitarists
1903 births
Guitarists from South Carolina
People from Greenwood County, South Carolina
American male guitarists
African-American guitarists